The European Diving Championships are biennial diving competitions, organized by LEN. The meet features divers from Europe, competing in events on 1-meter and 3-meter springboards and on 10-meter platform. The meet has traditionally been held in June.

History

Diving was an integral part of the European Aquatics Championships since its introduction in 1926.

A separate Diving Championships were first held in 2009 in Turin, and featured 10 events: individual diving from 1-meter springboard, 3-meter springboard and 10-meter platform among both men and women, and synchronized diving from 3-meter springboard and 10-meter platform among both men and women as well. The team event was added for the second edition of the Championships in Turin. Synchronized mixed diving events on 3-meter springboard and 10-meter platform were added for the fifth edition of the Championships in Kyiv.

Winners in the diving portion of the European Aquatics Championships event and in the separate European Diving Championships are both considered European champions, with new champions effectively being crowned annually.

A country that receives the most total points during the Championships officially becomes the European diving champion. The number of points is determined by results of all finalists, not only the medal holders. The 2017 European diving champion was Ukraine.

The  sixth edition was held between 5 and 11 August 2019 in Kyiv.

Editions

Medal table 
As of after 2019 edition. Source:

See also
 European Junior Diving Championships

References

External links
 Ligue Européenne de Natation LEN Official Website

 
LEN competitions
International diving competitions